Bramber was a parliamentary borough in Sussex, one of the most notorious of all the rotten boroughs. It elected two Members of Parliament (MPs) to the House of Commons in 1295, and again from 1472 until 1832, when the constituency was abolished by the Great Reform Act.

History
The borough consisted of the former market town of Bramber on the River Adur, which by the 19th century had decayed to the size of a small village. Bramber was barely distinguishable from neighbouring Steyning, with which it shared a main street, and for a century and a half after 1295 they formed a single borough collectively returning MPs. From the reign of Edward IV, however, they returned two MPs each, even though one part of Bramber was in the centre of Steyning so that a single property could in theory give rise to a vote in both boroughs. They were never substantial enough towns to deserve enfranchisement on their own merits, and both probably owed their status to a royal desire to gratify the courtiers that owned them with a degree of influence in the House of Commons.

Bramber was a burgage borough – the vote was restricted to inhabitants of ancient houses in the borough, or those built on ancient foundations, who paid scot and lot. In 1816 this amounted to only 20 voters, although as in 1831 the borough contained 35 houses and a population of approximately 170, this was a much higher proportion of the residents than in most burgage boroughs.

Bramber was slightly unusual in that the vote was accorded to the occupier rather than the owner of the burgage tenements, but in practice the owners had total control over the votes of their tenants – by bribery if not by threats – and therefore of elections in the borough. In Tudor times, the Dukes of Norfolk seem to have held sway. By the first half of the 18th century Bramber was wholly owned by Sir Harry Gough, who leased it (and the right to nominate its MPs) to Lord Archer; Lord Archer sold this right onwards in his turn, apparently being paid £1000 by the government to allow Lord Malpas to be elected in 1754. In 1768 the Duke of Rutland gained control, but Gough later regained power over one of the two seats and it was inherited by his descendants (who held the title Lord Calthorpe). These two families still shared the representation at the time of the Reform Act.

Bramber was abolished as a separate constituency with effect from the 1832 general election. However, the nearby borough of New Shoreham had already been expanded to include the whole of the Rape of Bramber as an antidote to its corruption, and survived the Reform Act with both its MPs intact. Bramber therefore formed part of the New Shoreham constituency from 1832.

Members of Parliament

before 1640

1640–1832

Notes

References
Robert Beatson, "A Chronological Register of Both Houses of Parliament" (London: Longman, Hurst, Res & Orme, 1807) 
D Brunton & D H Pennington, Members of the Long Parliament (London: George Allen & Unwin, 1954)
Cobbett's Parliamentary history of England, from the Norman Conquest in 1066 to the year 1803 (London: Thomas Hansard, 1808) 
 J. E. Neale, The Elizabethan House of Commons (London: Jonathan Cape, 1949)
 T. H. B. Oldfield, The Representative History of Great Britain and Ireland (London: Baldwin, Cradock & Joy, 1816)
 J Holladay Philbin, Parliamentary Representation 1832 – England and Wales (New Haven: Yale University Press, 1965)
 Edward Porritt and Annie G Porritt, The Unreformed House of Commons (Cambridge University Press, 1903)
 Frederic A Youngs, jr, "Guide to the Local Administrative Units of England, Vol I" (London: Royal Historical Society, 1979)

Parliamentary constituencies in South East England (historic)
Constituencies of the Parliament of the United Kingdom established in 1472
Constituencies of the Parliament of the United Kingdom disestablished in 1832
Rotten boroughs